Hackberries is a common name for
 the deciduous trees in the genus Celtis
 some of the butterflies in the genus Asterocampa